Jean Sadako King, (née McKillop born December 6, 1925 - November 24, 2013) was the seventh lieutenant governor of Hawaii, the state's first woman to be elected as such, from 1978 to 1982 in the administration of Governor George Ariyoshi.

Family 
Jean Sadako King was the daughter of William Donald McKillop and Chiyo Murakami McKillop. They married in the early 1920s. Her father, William Donald McKillop, was a postmaster of Scottish descent, whereas her mother, Chiyo Murakami Mckillop, was Japanese. Chiyo came from a family of coffee farmers in Kona. King's parents' interracial relationship was not common during that era. The couple settled in an area near Piikoi and Beretania in Honolulu, where King was born and raised. Later, King married James A. King and had a son and a daughter.

Education
King moved around throughout her years in primary school, having attended Likelike School, Aliiolani School, and the English Standard School. During her years in high school, she graduated as valedictorian at the Sacred Hearts Academy. King participated in various after-school activities while attending the Sacred Hearts Academy and was involved in Japanese dancing, tap, hula, and typing and shorthand lessons.

For her years in college, King was enrolled in the University of Hawaii, graduating with a B.A. in English by 1948. As an undergraduate student, she worked as a class assistant in a psychology lab, tutored English for a sports team, and served as a class officer. She was the co-editor for Ka Leo, which was the school newspaper in the University of Hawaii. Aside from King's academic strides, she won two pageants, taking the crown for Ka Palalpala Cosmopolitan Beauty Queen and Relay Rainbow Queen. After obtaining her B.A. from the University of Hawaii, King went for an M.A. in history at New York University. Then years later, King went back to the University of Hawaii for another master's. By 1968, King obtained her M.F.A. in theatre and drama. Her second master's thesis was putting together a production for a play, and she chose to base it on a play by Miyamato Ken about the Japanese anti-war.

Political career
Before King served in the Hawaii House of Representatives from 1972 to 1974 and the Hawaii Senate from 1974 to 1978, she was a candidate in the Hawai'i Constitutional Convention of 1950, then pursued the position of Lieutenant Governor of Hawai'i. In 1982, King was defeated in the Democratic primary election for Governor and retired from politics.

King's parents supported the Republican Party, but King wanted to push for more people to join the Democratic Party.  She felt that the philosophy of the Democratic Party would be of more interest in Hawaii's population of diverse ethnic backgrounds.  While strongly encouraging the public to be more involved with the politics, King was able to make laws pass that allowed the public to attend the meetings of government officials.

Death and legacy
According to her granddaughter, King died at age 87 from pancreatic cancer on November 24, 2013. With the effort and strides that King made, she had been an influence for more women to run for political positions in Hawaii. Senator Mazie Hirono was one of the women who admired King and remembered her with "As the first person elected to the office of lieutenant governor, Jean helped paved the way for women, such as myself." Colleen Hanabusa recognized King as a female role model.
In March 2016, Hawaiʻi Magazine ranked King in a list of the most influential women in Hawaiian history.

See also
 List of female lieutenant governors in the United States
 List of minority governors and lieutenant governors in the United States

References

1925 births
2013 deaths
Hawaii politicians of Japanese descent
American people of Scottish descent
American women of Japanese descent in politics
Lieutenant Governors of Hawaii
Democratic Party members of the Hawaii House of Representatives
Democratic Party Hawaii state senators
Politicians from Honolulu
Women state legislators in Hawaii
University of Hawaiʻi at Mānoa alumni
New York University alumni
Deaths from pancreatic cancer
Deaths from cancer in Hawaii
21st-century American women